Plainview Colony is a Hutterite colony and census-designated place (CDP) in Edmunds County, South Dakota, United States. It was first listed as a CDP prior to the 2020 census. The population of the CDP was 100 at the 2020 census.

Demographics
In the 2020 Census, Plainview Colony had a population of 100 people. The colony unanimously identifies as white with no second ethnicity.

Plainview Colony is staunchly supportive of the Republican Party. In the 2020 presidential election, the colony and its surrounding regions voted around 81.5% in favor of GOP incumbent Donald Trump over Democratic nominee Joe Biden, representing a further shift to the political right compared to the 2016 presidential election.

References 

Census-designated places in Edmunds County, South Dakota
Census-designated places in South Dakota
Hutterite communities in the United States